Soma Quality Recordings (or simply Soma Records) is an independent record label based in Glasgow, Scotland. It was co-founded in 1991 by the electronic music duo Slam, Dave Clarke and Glenn Gibbons. The label is known for releasing early works of Slam, Jeff Mills, Silicone Soul’s ″Right On Right On″, Funk D’Void, Felix da Housecat’s early track ″Clashback″, the original vinyl version of Daft Punk's track ″Da Funk″ and much more.

History
The origin of the label goes back to 1991 when there was very much a DIY ethos back at the tail end of the 80s. In that time, electronic music became more dominant in the music industry, with a greater reliance on synthesizers and the adoption of programmable drum machines and the advent of affordable music technology. A lot of enthusiastic group founders of people such as Soma founders that were passionated about music created a lot of well-known labels that are still existing nowadays. So there was the DJ and music producer duo called Slam consisting of Orde Meikle and Stuart McMillan who met in 1986 in Sheffield, where former was studying Geography at university and later was working in a bar. They did try to get some help from the rock infrastructure that existed in Scotland and sell the idea to a couple of people involved in the music industry, but they failed. So they decided to go to a small studio to make their first couple of tracks with Rejuvenation – duo from UK, consisting of Jim Muotune and Glenn Gibbons and press 1000 vinyls of techno EP called "Eterna / I.B.O.". Jim and Glenn were the sound engineers for the release. In addition, "Eterna" is still not only the first but one of the most iconic tracks of label's history. After all, they phoned record shops and asked them if they would like to buy 10 or 15 of vinyls, and the whole profit went to another 1000 vinyls pressed, and that is how Soma, they say, was born.

Soma is most known for releasing the original vinyl version of Daft Punk's track Da Funk in 1995. It contains uncredited beat sample of "Rock Bounce Roll Skate" performed by Vaughan Mason & Crew and drum break sample of "I'm Gonna Love You Just a Little More Babe"  performed by Barry White. This is what label's manager says about them in his interview to Fabric:

The label celebrated its 20th anniversary in 2011 and released the ″Soma Records – 20 Years compilation″ on 19 September 2011. The compilation contains a Daft Punk demo recording of a track called "Drive" that remained in the label's archives. On 31 March 2017 they turned 25 years old and to celebrate their anniversary, Soma enlisted Jeff Mills, Robert Hood, Adam Beyer and many others to contribute to a special box set ″Soma25″, which includes their long-lost remix of Daft Punk's ″Drive″. The label took part in a Boiler Room session in Glasgow showcasing its artists and local favourites. Soma Quality Records continues to be one of the UK's leading techno label's.

List of artists
This is a list of artists that are currently, or once were signed to Soma Quality Records:

0–9
 04LM

A
 Adam Beyer & Jesper Dahlback
 Alex Smoke
 Arnaud Le Texier
 Audio Spectrum

B
 B12
 Beroshima
 Bryan Zentz
 Buried Secrets
 Butch Cassidy Sound System

C
 Calculus
 Charles Fenckler
 Christian Wunsch
 Cleric
 Clouds
 Counterplan
 Cratesavers

D
 Daft Punk
 Dan Curtin
 Daniel Ibbotson
 Dax J
 Deepbass
 Deepchord
 Desert Storm
 Dove

E
 Eastmen
 EBE
 Edit Select
 Ege Bam Yasi
 Electric Rescue
 Envoy
 Equus
 Ewan Pearson

F
 Faculty X
 Felicie
 Frame
 Freelance Science Artist
 Freska
 Funk D'Void
 Funk D'Void & Sian

G
 G7
 Gary Beck
 Gemini Voice Archive
 Giordano

H
 H-Foundation
 Harvey McKay
 Heron
 Heron & Dantiez Saunderson
 Hipp-E & Tony
 Holmes & McMillan
 Hutton Drive
 Hystereo

I
 Ilario Alicante
 Indo Silver Club
 Itamar Sagi

J
 Jandroide
 Jaun Iborra
 Jef Dam
 Jeff Derringer
 Jet Project
 Joe Stawarz
 John Barber
 John Tejada

K
 Kontal
 Kyle Geiger

L
 Lars Huismann
 Lee Van Dowski & Tsack
 Let's Go Outside
 Lewis Fautzi
 Lex Horton
 Liebezeit
 LightSleepers
 Luciano

M
 Maas
 Magna Pia
 Manta Electrica
 Marco Bernardi
 Mark Henning
 Martinez
 Massi DL & Xpansul
 Monoloc
 My Robot Friend

N
 New Soul Fusion
 Norbak

O
 Octogen
 Oliver Deutschmann

P
 Percy X
 Petrichor
 Pig&Dan
 Pressure Funk

Q
 Quail + AISHA

R
 Rebekah
 Reeko
 Roberto Clementi
 ROD
 Roll Dann

S
 Schatrax
 Sci.Fi Hi.Fi
 Sci.Fi Lo.Fi
 Scott Grooves
 Secluded
 Setaoc Mass
 Sharkimaxx
 SHDW & Obscure Shape
 Sidetrax
 Sidewinder
 Silicone Soul
 Skintrade
 Slam
 Slam, Gary Beck
 SLV
 STS
 Symmetrical Behaviour
 Sündikat

T
 Temudo
 Tensal
 The Black Dog
 The Spirals
 The Surgeon
 The Unknown Wanderer
 Tony Thomas

U
 Uun

V
 Vector Lovers

W
 Wolf 'n' Flow
 Woo York

X
 X-Funk

Y
 Yan Cook

References

External links 
 
 Soma Quality Records discography at Discogs

Record labels established in 1991
Scottish record labels
Electronic music record labels
Ambient music record labels
Techno record labels
House music record labels